Jimmy Faulkner (31 January 1950 – 4 March 2008) was one of Ireland's top guitarists, who in a four-decade career played with many of Ireland's leading rock and roll, blues, folk and jazz musicians.

He was born in Dolphin's Barn, Dublin to a musical family. He started playing music in the 1960s with fellow Irish guitarist Dan Coffey, when he formed the Jangle Dangle band. He later played in Freak Show with Pete Cummins and vocalist Ditch Cassidy. In the 1970s and 1980s, he had a residence with Red Peters in the Meeting Place in Dorset Street in Dublin, and played with the Floating Dublin Blues Band, Christy Moore, Dónal Lunny, Mary Coughlan, Paul Brady and Luka Bloom. At the end of the 1980s, he went on to play with the Fleadh Cowboys, Hotfoot and regularly accompanied Kieran Halpin.

He could play in a number of styles: blues/rock, folk, traditional, country or even in the jazz style of Django Reinhardt. His main instrument was a red 1967 Fender Stratocaster, but he also played a Gibson ES335 which he got in California.

Before his death from cancer in 2008, he was playing weekly in Jj's in Aungier Street and in the DCC venue in Camden Row, among other venues.

Discography
 Whatever Tickles Your Fancy (1975)
 Christy Moore (1976)
 The Iron Behind the Velvet (1978)
 Live in Dublin (1978) 
 Smoke and Strong Whiskey (1991)

References

External links

1950 births
2008 deaths
Musicians from Dublin (city)
Irish guitarists
Irish male guitarists
Irish rock guitarists
Blues rock musicians
20th-century guitarists
20th-century male musicians